HMS Chichester was an 80-gun third rate ship of the line of the Royal Navy, launched at Chatham Dockyard on 6 March 1695.

She underwent a rebuild in 1706 at Woolwich Dockyard. Chichester served until 1749, when she was broken up.

Tobias Smollett, later to become a well-known writer, served as a naval surgeon on the Chichester.

Notes

References

Lavery, Brian (2003) The Ship of the Line - Volume 1: The development of the battlefleet 1650-1850. Conway Maritime Press. .

Ships of the line of the Royal Navy
1690s ships